Bathytroctes elegans is a species of slickheads (Alepocephalidae). It is found in the Western Indian Ocean.

References

External links 

 Bathytroctes elegans at FishBase

elegans
Taxa named by Yuri Igorevich Sazonov
Fish described in 1979
Fish of the Indian Ocean